Jason Sturgeon is an American country music artist born and raised in Petersburg, Indiana. He has released two albums via Toolpusher Records.

Biography
Sturgeon grew up in a family of coal miners, oilmen and farmers. His creative side helped to balance out his love for the outdoors.

Along with music, he enjoyed jockeying, as his grandparents on his mothers’ side had thoroughbreds. He eventually started racing in AQHA open horse shows and placed 8th in the World Championship Show in Oklahoma City and 4th in the Quarter Horse Congress in Columbus, Ohio.  From 15 until 19 during the summers, he worked in the oilfields for his family and learned to build, renovate, and basically do anything that needed to be done around the farm.

After high school Jason planned to head to Nashville, Tennessee but his father convinced him to attend college at Vincennes University first and learn a trade, just in case. He earned his degrees and became a medical device engineer for Cook Medical in Bloomington, Indiana.

After graduating from Vincennes University, he moved to Nashville to pursue his music career. Soon after moving to Nashville, he began touring, spending the majority of his first two years touring. His rapid city-to-city lifestyle inspired one of his hits "Time Bomb," a song about always being at a different venue in a different state. While he loved being on the road, he realized that he needed to settle down. He had plenty of experiences to write about after his time on the road. In 2012, Sturgeon played over 200 shows, and in 2013, he's on pace to top even that. In his 200+ shows during 2012, he opened for the likes of Gary Allan, Brooks & Dunn, Rodney Atkins, Luke Bryan, and Dierks Bentley, among others.

Music career
The band opened for artists like Brooks & Dunn, Rodney Atkins, Luke Bryan and others who were coming through the area, and they even released their own CD in 2008. Tapped to be part of Kenny Chesney’s “Next Big Star” competition, Sturgeon continued as a solo act. He traveled to Nashville but returned to Indiana until he received a phone call from Dane Clark, a member of John Mellencamp’s band.

He released That's Me in 2010. Cornfields & Coal followed in September 2013.

Discography

Studio albums

Singles

Music videos

References

American country singer-songwriters
Country musicians from Indiana
Living people
People from Petersburg, Indiana
Vincennes University alumni
Year of birth missing (living people)
Singer-songwriters from Indiana